Prag 1984 (Quartet Performance) is a live album by composer/saxophonist Anthony Braxton recorded at the Prague International Jazz Festival in 1984 and released on the Sound Aspects label.

Track listing
All compositions by Anthony Braxton
 Announcement – 0:52
 "Composition 105A / Composition 110A / Composition 114 / Composition 69H" – 59:07

Personnel
 Anthony Braxton – alto saxophone, soprano saxophone, C melody saxophone, clarinet, flute
 Marilyn Crispell – piano
 John Lindberg – bass
 Gerry Hemingway – drums

References

Anthony Braxton live albums
1990 live albums